Rocks Into Rivers is the second studio album by Christian alternative rock band Seabird. The album was released on December 15, 2009 on Credential Recordings. The first single from the album is "Don't You Know You're Beautiful".

Track listing
 Don't You Know You're Beautiful
 Believe Me
 Sing To Save My Life
 Trust
 The Good King
 Baby I'm In Love
 This Ain't Home
 The Sound Of You And I
 Don't Change A Thing
 This Road
 Finally Done Right
 Rocks Into Rivers

References

2009 albums
Seabird (band) albums
Credential Recordings albums